Mats Helge, also known as Mats-Helge Olsson (born 10 May 1953) is a Swedish independent filmmaker, best known for movies such as The Ninja Mission (1984), and he is one of the most productive independent Swedish directors ever, with almost 100 titles to his résumé. He began his career with movies in the 1970s with movies the press called "lingonwesterns".

He also directed "I Död mans spår", with Carl-Gustaf Lindstedt and a couple of six-shooters, shot in High Chaparral in Småland, Sweden. Then he made candid camera with Per Oscarsson in Lidköping, and The Ninja Mission.

Then he went on to make a few movies with the American actor David Carradine, and action-movies like Blood Tracks, Eagle Island, Spökligan, SilverHawk, The Hired Gun, Animal Protector, The Forgotten Wells, The Mad Bunch, Fatal Secret, The Russian Terminator, Babysitter and the short-lived Robert Aschberg-series Nordexpressen.

References

Regissören som försvann - Historien om The Ninja Mission, SVT, 13 September 2013.

External links

Swedish film directors
1953 births
Living people